Alcântaras is a  municipality in the state of Ceará in the Northeast region of Brazil.

Culture

Quadrilha Junina 
(Festival de Quadrilhas Juninas de Alcântaras): Hundreds of large groups of traditional folke dances that organize to make presentations, usually to the sound of Forró, during the festas juninas, in the month of June (and also July).

Cuisine: Brazilian cuisine includes feijoada. There are some dishes which are typical of the northeast of Brazil, as macaxera, tapioca, carne do sol, but the typical food of Ceará is Baião de Dois.

Religion: The dominant Religion of Alcântaras is Roman Catholicism due to the influence Portuguese.

Climate

Alcântaras has a typical tropical climate. The climate of Alcântaras is hot almost all year. The temperature in the municipality varies from 18 to 36 °C (64 to 97 °F)

Government

 Eliesio Fonteles
 Joaquim Carvalho

Notable people
Caetano Ximenes de Aragão, doctor and writer (February 24, 1927 - June 14, 1995).

Access

One road give access to the city: CE-241.

Schools

There are five schools on the city.
 Escola Gregório Cunha Freire
 Escola José P. Barroso
 Escola Inocência Alcântara Freire
 Escola Estadual Francisco de Almeida Monte
 Escola Maria Raulino

Media
The city has one radio station, Rádio Bela Vista FM.

References

Municipalities in Ceará